Sumapaz  Province is one of the 15 provinces in the Cundinamarca Department, Colombia.

External links 
 Sumapaz Province in Cundinamarca

Provinces of Cundinamarca Department
Province